Tony Chalmers (born 9 December 1964) is an Australian former professional rugby league footballer who played in the 1980s and 1990s.

Playing career
Chalmers made his first grade debut at the age of 20 with the Parramatta Eels in Round 7 of the 1985 NSWRL season, becoming the 439th player to do so. Playing on the wing, he scored a try on debut.

In his second year with the club, he won a premiership when Parramatta defeated Canterbury-Bankstown in the 1986 Grand Final.

In 1987, Chalmers found himself regularly in the run-on squad. He scored 7 tries that season, a career best. In his final year with the Eels, he scored 3 tries.

In 1989, Chalmers began playing with the Balmain Tigers. An injury sustained in the early part of the season saw him sidelined for 5 weeks. Returning in Round 10, he was part of squad that took Balmain to the grand final. Balmain went down to the Canberra Raiders 19–14 in extra time.  Chalmers played in the semi final victory over South Sydney but did not play in the grand final itself.

In his final season in the NSWRL, Chalmers only played three first grade games. His final game was played against the Illawarra Steelers in round 15. He scored a try in Balmain's 32–8 victory.

Post playing
Chalmers is now employed as floor manager for the Nine Network.

References

1964 births
Living people
Rugby league players from Sydney
Australian rugby league players
Parramatta Eels players
Balmain Tigers players
Rugby league wingers
Place of birth missing (living people)